David Herman (born 1967) is an American actor, comedian and voice actor.

David Herman or Dave Herman may also refer to:

Dave Herman (American football) (born 1941)
David Herman (BMX rider) (born 1988), American racing cyclist
Dave Herman (fighter) (born 1984), American mixed martial artist
Dave Herman (DJ) (1936–2014), American disc jockey